Todd Klick is an American author, screenwriter, director and producer based in Los Angeles. His book, Something Startling Happens: The 120 Story Beats Every Writer Needs To Know became a #1 bestseller on Amazon.com for Screenwriting and Writing Skills.  It is also a bestseller for his publisher, Michael Wiese Publications. Klick is also the author of the eBook The Screenwriter's Fairy: The Universal Story Within All Movie Stories (a very brief fable), which has also been #1 on Amazon for Screenwriting., and is a contributing author for the #1 bestselling Tarcher-Penguin book, Now Write! Science Fiction, Fantasy and Horror: Speculative Genre Exercises from Today’s Best Writers and Teachers.

Klick leads seminars at screenwriting conferences and symposiums  and is a contributor to The Huffington Post  and MovieMaker Magazine.

Early life
Klick grew up in rural Pennsylvania, which he writes about in his Huffington Post article, Goodbye Ray Bradbury, My Friend.

Something Startling Happens
Something Startling Happens: The 120 Story Beats Every Writer Needs To Know is a minute-by-minute analysis of successful movies and what their stories share in common each minute. It reached #1 on Amazon for Screenwriting and Writing Skills in December 2011 after its October 2011 release, and has been a consistent best-seller in that genre.

The book was inspired by Blake Snyder's book on screenwriting, Save The Cat! The Last Book on Screenwriting You'll Ever Need.

The Screenwriter's Fairy Tale
The nonfiction ebook The Screenwriter's Fairy Tale: The Universal Story Within All Movie Stories (a very brief fable) is a 13-page ebook fable that shows how archetypal story patterns work in each act of a screenplay.

Works

Filmography
Rough Cut: The Murder of Randi Trimble (2009)
Followed (2019)

Bibliography
 Something Startling Happens: The 120 Story Beats Every Writer Needs To Know (2011) 
 The Screenwriter's Fairy Tale: The Universal Story Within All Movie Stories (2012) 
 Screamin' Willie & The Lynchin' Tree (2013)

Articles
 How Spielberg And Shakespeare Found Their Groove, Huffington Post (2012) 
 Something Startling Happens (The Missing Chapter), The Writer's Store (2012) 
 Goodbye Ray Bradbury, My Friend, Huffington Post (2012) 
 10 Beats To A Better Beginning, MovieMaker Magazine (2012)

References

External links
 http://www.toddklick.com
 http://somethingstartlinghappens.blogspot.com
 Todd Klick featured on blakesnyder.com
 Interview with Todd Klick on Connie Martinson Talks Books
 Interview with Todd Klick on Film School Rejects Podcast
 Interview with Todd Klick from OnlyGoodMovies.com
 Todd Klick interviewed by shockya.com
 Todd Klick interview by Gemini Adams at finishyourbooknow.com
 

American non-fiction writers
Living people
Screenwriting instructors
American film critics
American male screenwriters
American male non-fiction writers
Film theorists
Writers of books about writing fiction
Year of birth missing (living people)